Paris Adult Theatre I v. Slaton, 413 U.S. 49 (1973), was a case in which the U.S. Supreme Court upheld a state court's injunction against the showing of obscene films in a movie theatre restricted to consenting adults. The Court distinguished the case from Stanley v. Georgia, saying that the privacy of the home that was controlling in Stanley was not present in the commercial exhibition of obscene movies in a theatre.

See also

 Comstock laws
 List of United States Supreme Court cases, volume 413
 United States obscenity law

References

External links
 

United States obscenity case law
United States Supreme Court cases
United States Supreme Court cases of the Burger Court
1973 in United States case law